Brett Hill (8 August 1944 – 5 July 2002) was an Australian swimmer. He competed in the men's 200 metre butterfly at the 1964 Summer Olympics.

References

External links
 

1944 births
2002 deaths
Australian male butterfly swimmers
Olympic swimmers of Australia
Swimmers at the 1964 Summer Olympics
Commonwealth Games medallists in swimming
Commonwealth Games silver medallists for Australia
Commonwealth Games bronze medallists for Australia
Swimmers at the 1962 British Empire and Commonwealth Games
Swimmers at the 1966 British Empire and Commonwealth Games
Swimmers from Sydney
20th-century Australian people
Medallists at the 1962 British Empire and Commonwealth Games
Medallists at the 1966 British Empire and Commonwealth Games